Mayo often refers to:

 Mayonnaise, often shortened to "mayo"
 Mayo Clinic, a medical center in Rochester, Minnesota, United States

Mayo may also refer to:

Places

Antarctica
 Mayo Peak, Marie Byrd Land

Australia
 Division of Mayo, an Australian Electoral Division in South Australia

Canada
 Mayo, Quebec, a municipality
 Mayo, Yukon, a village
 Mayo (electoral district), Yukon, a former electoral district

Cape Verde
 Maio, Cape Verde (also formerly known as Mayo Island)

Republic of Ireland
 County Mayo
 Mayo (Dáil constituency)
 Mayo (Parliament of Ireland constituency)
 Mayo (UK Parliament constituency)
 Mayo, County Mayo, a village

Ivory Coast
Mayo, Ivory Coast, a town and commune

Thailand
 Mayo District, Pattani Province

United Kingdom
 Mayo, a townland in County Down, Northern Ireland
 Mayo (UK Parliament constituency), a former constituency encompassing the whole of County Mayo

United States
 Mayo, Florida, a town
 Mayo, Kentucky, an unincorporated community
 Mayo, Maryland, a census-designated place
 Mayo, South Carolina, a census-designated place
 Mayo Lake, North Carolina, a reservoir

Multiple places
 Mayo River (disambiguation), various rivers

Schools 
 Mayo Clinic School of Medicine, formerly Mayo Medical School, an American medical school that is part of the Mayo Clinic and the Mayo Clinic College of Medicine and Science
 Mayo High School, a public high school in Rochester, Minnesota, United States
 Mayo College, a secondary educational institution in Ajmer, Rajasthan, India

People 
 Mayo (surname)
 Mayo (given name)
 Mayo people, an indigenous ethnic group in the Mexican states of Sinaloa and Sonora
 Meo (ethnic group) or Mayo, an Indian ethnic tribe of Rajputs
 James Mayo, pen name of Stephen Coulter (born 1913/14), English author

Other uses
 Short Mayo Composite, a piggy-back long-range seaplane/flying boat combination built by Short Brothers in the late 1930s
 , World War II US Navy destroyer
 Earl of Mayo, a title in the Peerage of Ireland
 Viscount Mayo, a title that has been created twice in the Peerage of Ireland
 Mayo GAA, a county board of the Gaelic Athletic Association
 Mayo county football team
 Mayo county hurling team
 Mayo language, spoken by the Mayo people
 Mayo (TV series), a BBC television series first broadcast in 2006
 "Mayo" (song), by DJ Speedsta
 Mayo Hospital, in Lahore, Pakistan
 Mayo Hotel, Tulsa, Oklahoma, on the National Register of Historic Places
 Mexican American Youth Organization
 Project Mayo, an open source project by DivX, Inc.
 Mayo v. Prometheus, a U.S. Supreme Court case
 Avenida de Mayo, an avenue in Buenos Aires, Argentina